Celebrity Watch Party (known as Celebrity Gogglebox USA internationally) is an American reality television series that aired on Fox from May 7 to July 23, 2020. The show is based on the British television series Gogglebox and features celebrities recording themselves watching and reacting to television shows and news stories inside their homes. Due to the impact of the COVID-19 pandemic on television, Fox pushed back the premieres of some scripted series to later in the year and opted to create Celebrity Watch Party as one of two shows—along with The Masked Singer: After the Mask—that could be produced remotely to fill the programming gap.

Production
On April 30, 2020, it was announced that the series would premiere on May 7, 2020. The initial celebrity participants announced included Rob Lowe, Meghan Trainor, Joe Buck, Raven-Symoné, Master P and Romeo, JoJo Siwa, Steve Wozniak, Curtis Stone, and Robert and Kym Herjavec. On May 7, 2020, Sharon, Ozzy, and Kelly Osbourne, Tyra Banks, and Reggie Bush were announced to be celebrity participants in the series as well. Justin Long, Jesse McCartney, Jodie Sweetin, Andrea Barber, and Lindsay and Aliana Lohan later joined as participants in future episodes.

On July 9, 2020, it was announced that the series was extended an extra week, with a new installment airing on July 23.

International broadcasts
The series has aired in Australia on ViacomCBS-owned Network 10 since June 11, 2020 (Network 10 also co-produces and airs the Australian version of the series, under the original Gogglebox title). It is locally edited by 10 with an Australian narrator amongst other changes.

In the United Kingdom, the series has aired on E4 (the sister network of Channel 4, which broadcasts the original British version) since May 13, 2020, and is available on-demand via All 4.

Episodes

Ratings

References

External links 
 
 

2020 American television series debuts
2020 American television series endings
2020s American reality television series
English-language television shows
Celebrity reality television series
Fox Broadcasting Company original programming
Television series about television
Television series by All3Media
Television series impacted by the COVID-19 pandemic
American television series based on British television series